The Deep South Heavyweight Championship was the primary championship in Deep South Wrestling, a former developmental territory of World Wrestling Entertainment (WWE) between 2005 and 2007. When the title was first introduced, it was awarded to Tommy Rich, who won a tournament to determine the inaugural champion. The final champion of its first run was The Assassin, who vacated the title due to injury and folded the promotion in October 1988.

In 2005, after seventeen years of inactivity, Deep South Wrestling was revived as a developmental territory for WWE and revived the championship. It was awarded to Mike Mizanin, who won a tournament to become champion. The title was vacated on April 18, 2007, when WWE ceased using DSW as a developmental territory. On July 12, 2007, a tournament was held to crown a new champion, which was won by Austin Creed. In October 2007, DSW closed down a second time. The championship has yet to be revived upon DSW's return in February 2021.

Creation
The title was first awarded to the winner of an 8-Man Single Elimination Tournament, held over a 2-week period, with the first-round matches being held November 23, 2005, and the semi-final and final matches on December 1.

After WWE
The title was "held-up" after the agreement between WWE and DSW ended in March 2007, and another tournament was held in on July 12 to crown the new champion.

↑Alexander the Great defeated Salvatore Rinauro by Coin Toss

Title history

Combined reigns

References

External links
Deep South Heavyweight title history
 DSW Heavyweight Championship

Heavyweight wrestling championships
Regional professional wrestling championships